Kondek-e Khanjar (also known as Kondak-e Sarāydīn, Kondek-e Yek, Kondok-e Sarāyeddīn, Kondok Sarāyeddīn, and Kundak Sarāyeddīn) is a village in Gazin Rural District, Raghiveh District, Haftgel County, Khuzestan Province, Iran. At the 2006 census, its population was 65, in 11 families.

References 

Populated places in Haftkel County